The N973 is a provincial road in the municipality of Westerwolde in the province of Groningen in the Netherlands. It runs from Wedde to Bellingwolde.

Route description 
It starts in Wedde and runs northeast to Bellingwolde in the municipality of Westerwolde.

Junction and exit list

References 

973
Westerwolde (municipality)